The Curse of King Tut's Tomb may refer to:

 The Curse of King Tut's Tomb (1980 film), a film directed by Philip Leacock
 The Curse of King Tut's Tomb (2006 film), a film directed by Russell Mulcahy